Steve Alexander may refer to:

Steve Alexander (businessman) (born 1951), professional coach and communications expert
Steve Alexander (drummer) (born 1962), Welsh drummer

See also
Stephen Alexander (disambiguation)